Paris Tristesse is an album by Québécois singer and keyboardist Pierre Lapointe, released on February 10, 2015. It reached a peak position of number nine on the Top Canadian Albums chart.

Track listing
 "Les lignes de ma main" – 1:52
 "Je déteste ma vie" – 3:26
 "Nos joies répétitives" – 4:07
 "Tous les visages" – 2:32
 "Les remords ont faim" – 3:21
 "Nu devant moi" – 3:14
 "Au 27-100 rue des Partances" – 2:55
 "La plus belle des maisons" – 2:31
 "Tel un seul homme" – 3:59
 "Quelques gouttes de sang" – 1:40
 "Tu es seul et resteras seul" – 2:36
 "S'il te plaît" – 1:57
 "C'est extra" – 3:51
 "Le mal de vivre" – 3:45
 "Comme ils disent" – 4:37

Track listing adapted from AllMusic.

Charts

References

2015 albums
French-language albums
Pierre Lapointe albums